The 2022 NAB League Girls season was the sixth season of the NAB League Girls competition for under-19 female Australian rules footballers in Victoria. The season commenced on 22 January and concluded with the Grand Final on 8 April. The premiership was won by the Western Jets, who claimed their first title by defeating the Dandenong Stingrays in the grand final.

Format
The league consisted of 13 full-time teams (12 from Victoria and 1 from Tasmania) that competed in a nine-match, ten-round regular season. There were also three academy teams that partook in guest matches but were not eligible for finals (those teams were Brisbane Lions Academy, Gold Coast Suns Academy and Northern Territory). The finals series was determined via a conference system. The top two teams based in regional Victoria and Tasmania and top two teams from metropolitan Victoria (i.e.: Melbourne) compete in a knockout preliminary final, with the two winners to meet in the grand final and play off for the premiership. Teams that failed to qualify for the preliminary finals played off in repechage round. The duration of quarters was lengthened from 17 to 20 minutes. One match per round was streamed via the Herald Sun website, and all other matches were streamed on the NAB League app.

Ladder

NOTE: This ladder does not include the repechage round of fixtures between teams who did not qualify for the preliminary finals.

Finals series

Preliminary finals

Grand Final

See also
 2022 NAB League Boys season

References

External links
 Season results (Australian Football)

NAB League
NAB League Girls
Nab League Girls